RCMAC may refer to:

 Recurrent cerebellar model articulation controller
 Regulated Contention Medium Access Control
 Raw Cotton Marketing Advisory Committee
 Recent change memory administration center, in late 20th century Bell System parlance, an organization of people in a phone company responsible for programming the service and features purchased by customers into the central office; sometimes mistakenly called: "recent change message accounting center"
 Regional Chartered Mediator Accreditation Committee
 Regional Courts Management Advisory Committees
 Residential Colleges Management Advisory Committee